The People's Union (UP) is a left-wing political alliance in Italy launched on 9 July 2022 by Luigi de Magistris.

History

Background 
During a national assembly of Democracy and Autonomy (DemA) in January 2022, Luigi de Magistris, party leader and former Mayor of Naples, announced his intention to create a new coalition of left-wing parties, starting from his own party. In February, four deputies founded a sub-group at the Chamber of Deputies called "ManifestA". All of them had been elected in the 2018 general election for the Five Star Movement, a big-tent populist party, and then left the party and joined either Power to the People (PaP) or Communist Refoundation Party (PRC).

On 28 April, at the Chamber of Deputies, de Magistris and the four deputies of ManifestA, held a joint conference to launch a coalition of parties opposed to the Russo-Ukrainian war and Mario Draghi's government for the next general election, initially scheduled to be held in 2023. He also stated that the group would not join the centre-left coalition led by the Democratic Party.

On 9 July, De Magistris organised an assembly named "Towards the People's Union", which was attended also by PaP, the PRC, ManifestA and other groups. The coalition will participate in the 2022 general election.

On 16 December, the 4th October Movement, a brekaway-party from the Five Star Movement, announced they will join People's Union, along with their two regional councillors in Piedmont.

Composition

Founding member parties

Electoral results

Italian Parliament

Regional Councils

References

2022 establishments in Italy
Communist parties in Italy
Communist Refoundation Party
Democratic socialist parties in Europe
Left-wing political party alliances
Left-wing politics in Italy
Political parties established in 2022
Political party alliances in Italy